Buada Constituency is one of the constituencies of Nauru. It returns two members from Buada to the Parliament of Nauru in Yaren.

Members of Parliament

Election results

References

External links

Constituencies of Nauru